The 1994 Danamon Indonesia Open was a women's tennis tournament played on outdoor hard courts at the Gelora Senayan Stadium in Jakarta, Indonesia and was part of Tier IV of the 1994 WTA Tour. It was the second edition of the tournament and was held from 25 April through 1 May 1994. Third-seeded Yayuk Basuki won the singles title and earned $18,000 first-prize money.

Finals

Singles

 Yayuk Basuki defeated  Florencia Labat 6–4, 3–6, 7–6(7–1)
 It was Basuki's 2nd singles title of the year and the 6th and last of her career.

Doubles

 Nicole Arendt /  Kristine Radford defeated  Kerry-Anne Guse /  Andrea Strnadová 6–2, 6–2
 It was Arendt's only doubles title of the year and the 2nd of her career. It was Radford's only doubles title of the year and the 2nd of her career.

References

External links
 ITF tournament edition details
 Tournament draws

Danamon Open
Danamon Open
Danamon Indonesia Women's Open
Danamon Indonesia Women's Open
Danamon Indonesia Women's Open
Danamon Indonesia Women's Open